Charekone is a small village in Siddapura Taluk Uttara Kannada District, Karnataka State; Which is about  from Sirsi and  from Siddapur.

It is nestled among the Western Ghats of Karnataka. Areca nut cultivation is the primary occupation of the people in this village.

Demography
Sirsi Kannada Dialect & Havigannada is the spoken language.

Transport
Bus service is provided by KSRTC, which runs buses that connect Charekone to Sirsi.

The nearest railway station is Talaguppa, which is  - connects Shimoga, Mysore, Bangalore, Chennai, Hydrabad etc., and Kumta, which is about  - connects Karwar, Goa, Mumbai, Pune, Mangalore and Kerala.

Economy and occupations
The main occupation of the residents is agriculture. Growing Supari (arecanut) is the primary business of the people. Other than arecanut, commodities like paddy, cardamom, coconut and pepper also grown.

Temples

Education
H.P.S Taresar is the Only School near this village - Which is about  towards Herur

Places to see near Charekone
The region located in the Malnad region, within the Western Ghats. There are forests and hills and waterfalls that are attractive for trekking.
 Unchalli Falls (KeppaJoga) – 
 Shri Lakshmi Narasimha Temple, Shriman Nelemavu Mutt.
 Shri Siddivinayaka Temple, Herur

Hospitals
Following hospitals are located Near Charekone.
 Govt Hospital Herur

Villages in Uttara Kannada district